Sir Joseph-Adolphe Chapleau  (November 9, 1840 – June 13, 1898), born in Sainte-Thérèse, Quebec, was a French-Canadian lawyer and politician who served as the 7th Lieutenant Governor of Quebec from 1892 to 1898.

Life

As a lawyer, he defended Ambroise-Dydime Lépine against the charge of murdering Thomas Scott during the Red River Rebellion of 1869–1870.

He served as the fifth premier of Quebec, federal Cabinet minister, and the seventh lieutenant governor of Quebec.

After the 1878 Quebec election, he was the Leader of the Opposition. He became premier in 1879 after the fall of the minority government of Henri-Gustave Joly de Lotbinière. He won the 1881 election, but resigned on July 29, 1882, to seek election to the federal House of Commons. He won a by-election held on August 16, 1882.

Chapleau planned to quit politics in 1885 when Louis Riel was sentenced to be hanged but decided to stay, fearing it would only inflame the situation. After Riel was hanged, he was attacked by Quebecers who accused him of the death of Riel along with John A. Macdonald.

He served as Minister of Justice under prime ministers John A. Macdonald and John Abbott, but declined to serve under John Thompson. He resigned in 1892, and was appointed Lieutenant Governor of Quebec from December 1892 until January 1898. He died in June of that same year in Montreal, Quebec. His funeral monument can be seen at the Notre Dame des Neiges Cemetery.

Elections as party leader
He won the 1881 election.

Family
On November 25, 1874, he married Marie Louise, daughter of Lieutenant-colonel Charles King of Sherbrooke in the province of Quebec.

Electoral record 

Note: popular vote is compared to vote in 1882 general election.

See also

Politics of Quebec
List of Quebec general elections
Timeline of Quebec history

References

Further reading
DUSSAULT, Roy. « Défense des intérêts des Canadiens français et unité de la Confédération canadienne : la pensée nationaliste de Joseph-Adolphe Chapleau, 1840–1898». Mémoire de maîtrise, Québec, Université Laval, 2018, 177 p.

Joseph-Adolphe Chapleau fonds, Library and Archives Canada. 
Biography at the Dictionary of Canadian Biography Online

External links
 

1840 births
1898 deaths
Lawyers in Quebec
Conservative Party of Canada (1867–1942) MPs
Canadian Knights Commander of the Order of St Michael and St George
Members of the House of Commons of Canada from Quebec
Members of the King's Privy Council for Canada
Premiers of Quebec
Conservative Party of Quebec MNAs
Quebec political party leaders
Persons of National Historic Significance (Canada)
People from Sainte-Thérèse, Quebec
Lieutenant Governors of Quebec
Burials at Notre Dame des Neiges Cemetery